Pimascovirales is an order of viruses. The term is a portmanteau of a portmanteau of pitho-, irido-, marseille-, and ascoviruses.

Families
The following families are recognized:

 Ascoviridae
 Iridoviridae
 Marseilleviridae

References

Viruses